Perforissidae is an extinct family of planthoppers. They are considered to belong to the group of "Cixiidae-like" planthoppers. Species are known from the Early to Late Cretaceous of Eurasia, North America and South America. The family was named by Shcherbakov in 2007

Taxonomy 
 †subfamily Cixitettiginae Shcherbakov 2007
 †Aafrita Szwedo and Azar 2013 Lebanese amber, Barremian
 †Cixitettix Shcherbakov 2007 Taimyr amber, Russia, Santonian
 †Foveopsis Shcherbakov 2007 Burmese amber, Myanmar, Cenomanian
 †Foveopsis fennahi Shcherbakov 2007
 †Foveopsis heteroidea Zhang et al. 2017
 †Iberofoveopsis Peñalver and Szwedo 2010 San Just amber, Escucha Formation, Albian
 †Lanlakawa Luo et al. 2020 Burmese amber, Myanmar, Cenomanian
 †Tsaganema Shcherbakov 2007 Dzun-Bain Formation, Mongolia, Aptian
 †subfamily Perforissinae Shcherbakov 2007
 †Cretargus Shcherbakov 2007 Taimyr amber, Russia, Santonian
 †Perforissus Shcherbakov 2007 New Jersey amber, Turonian
 †Aonikenkissus Petrulevicius et al. 2014 Mata Amarilla Formation, Argentina, Cenomanian

References

Fulgoromorpha
Prehistoric insect families